Motown Remembers Marvin Gaye: Never Before Released Masters is a posthumous compilation album featuring the singer's unreleased recordings dating from 1963 to 1972 when Gaye was recording with Motown Records. Many of the records featured are overdubbed with eighties-styled drum programming and featured background vocalists whereas original recordings of the songs feature no background vocals and the instrumentation was more live than what is featured in this collection which was produced within a year after Gaye's 1984 death.

In 1988, Motown re-released the album with an extended version of "I Heard It Through the Grapevine", titling it Never-Before-Released Masters + I Heard It Through the Grapevine.

Track listing
"I Heard It Through the Grapevine" (4:44) (1988 issue only)
"The World Is Rated X" (6:27)
"Lonely Lover" (2:37)
"Just Like a Man" (3:06)
"I'm Going Home" (3:41)
"No Greater Love" (3:38)
"Dark Side of the World" (3:34)
"Loving and Affection" (2:35)
"I'm in Love with You" (2:56)
"That's the Way It Goes" (3:06)
"I Gotta Have Your Lovin'" (2:50)
"Baby I'm Glad That Things Worked Out So Well" (3:10)
"Baby (Don't You Leave Me)" (with Kim Weston) (2:28)

1986 compilation albums
Albums produced by Hal Davis
Compilation albums published posthumously
Marvin Gaye compilation albums
Motown compilation albums